Ajitha Vijayan is a Communist Party of India politician from Thrissur city, India. She is the seventh mayor of Thrissur Municipal Corporation.

References

Mayors of Thrissur
Female politicians of the Communist Party of India

21st-century Indian women politicians

Living people
21st-century Indian politicians
Women mayors of places in Kerala

1973 births
Communist Party of India politicians from Kerala